Ruhinda was the first Omugabe of Nkore, a king-like position, in Nkore, a kingdom in present-day Uganda that was renamed Ankole in colonial times. His approximate reign dates are c. 1430 to 1446.

He is descended from the Bachwezi Dynasty of the Empire of Kitara. Ruhinda was a son of Ndahura, the last Chwezi king.

References

Ugandan monarchies